The 2008–09 Isle of Man League was the 100th season of Football league on the Isle of Man.

There were two tiers of men's football, consisting 27 clubs, the Sure Mobile Premier League and the CFS Division Two. There were six senior cup competitions – the Manx FA Cup, Railway Cup, Hospital Cup, Woods Cup, Paul Henry Gold Cup and the Charity Shield. Each club had a reserve team in the Isle of Man Football Combination, and they compete in the Junior Cup. There was also the Cowell Cup, an annual Under-19 tournament.

League tables

Premier League

Division 2

Cups
Cup results for 2008–09:

FA Cup

Douglas HSOB   1–1 (3–2 on pens.)    St Georges

Railway Cup
Peel   0–1    Rushen United

Hospital Cup
St Georges   2–1    Laxey

Woods Cup
Douglas Royal   1–0    Pulrose United

Paul Henry Gold Cup
Castletown Metropolitan   4–0    Marown

Cowell Cup (U19)
Castletown Metropolitan   3–1    St Johns United

References

FA Full Time – IOM Football League 2008–09 Premier Division
FA Full Time – IOM Football League 2008–09 Division Two

Isle of Man Football League seasons
Man
Foot
Foot